Four Seasons Private Residences at 706 Mission Street, San Francisco (formerly named 706 Mission Street) is a 43-story,  residential skyscraper under construction in the South of Market district of San Francisco, California. Located across the street from Yerba Buena Gardens and Moscone Center, the tower site is bounded by Mission Street on the south and 3rd Street on the east, and will incorporate the historic Aronson Building in its design. The tower will contain up to 190 condominiums on the upper floors and a permanent home for the Mexican Museum on the bottom four floors.

History
The project was approved by the San Francisco Planning Commission and Board of Supervisors in 2013, and construction started in February 2016.

Pre-sales for the 146 condos began in May 2019, ranging from $2.3 million per unit up to $49 million for the top-floor penthouse, making the latter the highest-priced penthouse in San Francisco. It has 12 penthouse units priced in the $15 million to $25 million range. The project was taken over by Westbrook Partners in the fall of 2019, creating the 706 Mission Co. LLC entity.  In October 2019, the San Francisco Business Times reported that The Four Seasons Private Residences was hiring art and wine experts. In January 2020, it was reported that athlete Steph Curry was buying a unit in the tower. The condo tower is scheduled to be complete in June 2020. After the coronavirus pandemic impacted the physical sales process for several months, the residence began offering virtual real estate tours in May 2020.

Notable tenants
Steph Curry - Golden State Warriors

Legal 
After approval in 2013, the development faced a lawsuit from residents of the nearby Four Seasons Hotel & Residences, which was settled in 2015.

See also

 List of tallest buildings in San Francisco

References

External links

 

Skyscrapers in San Francisco
Residential buildings in San Francisco
Residential skyscrapers in San Francisco
South of Market, San Francisco
Buildings and structures under construction in the United States